Batriana was a civitas (town) of Roman North Africa. The location of the town remains unknown but it was somewhere south of Tunis (Carthage).

The town was also the seat of a Roman era Christian bishopric, which although ceasing to function with the Muslim conquest of the Maghreb, survives today as a titular see of the Roman Catholic Church, and the current bishop is Renzo Fratini of Andorra.

References

Roman towns and cities in Africa (Roman province)
Catholic titular sees in Africa
Former populated places in Tunisia